Architecture-driven modernization in computing and computer science, is the name of the initiative of the Object Management Group (see OMG ADM Task Force website) related to building and promoting standards that can be applied to modernize legacy systems. The objective of this initiative is to provide standard representations of views of existing systems, in order to enable common modernization activities, such as code analysis and comprehension, and software transformation.

History 
 In June 2003, The Object Management Group (OMG) formed a task force to model in the context of existing software systems. Initially, the group was called Legacy Transformation Task Force, but then the name was unanimously changed to Architecture-Driven Modernization Task Force (ADMTF). ADMTF is co-chaired by Djenana Campara, from KDM Analytics and William Ulrich, from Tactical Strategy Group.
 In November 2003, the OMG's Architecture-Driven Modernization Task Force recommended, and the Platform Technical Committee issued, the Knowledge Discovery Metamodel Request For Proposal (RFP).
 In February 2005, the OMG's Architecture-Driven Modernization Task Force recommended, and the Platform Technical Committee issued, the Abstract Syntax Tree Metamodel (ASTM) Request For Proposal (RFP). This work is still in progress. OMG has not yet adopted this specification.
 In May 2006, the Team's submission—the Knowledge Discovery Metamodel—was adopted by the OMG and moved into the finalization stage of the OMG's standards adoption process. The OMG adopted Specification for KDM became publicly available (OMG document ptc/06-06-07).
 In September 2006, the OMG's Architecture-Driven Modernization Task Force recommended, and the Platform Technical Committee issued, the Software Metrics Metamodel (SMM) Request For Proposal (RFP). This work is still in progress.
 In March 2007, the KDM Finalization Task Force finished the finalization stage of OMG's standards adoption process. The recommended specification KDM 1.0 is available from OMG.

Knowledge Discovery Metamodel (KDM) 

The foundation of the architecture-driven modernization initiative is the OMG specification Knowledge Discovery Metamodel (KDM). Usually the knowledge obtained from existing software is presented in the form of models to which specific queries can be made when necessary. An entity relationship diagram is a frequent format of representing knowledge obtained from existing software. Knowledge Discovery Metamodel defines an ontology for the software assets and their relationships for the purpose of performing knowledge discovery of existing code. The KDM Analytics company maintains an open portal for the Knowledge Discovery Metamodel (see KDM Portal).

Relationship to MDA 
Existing (or legacy) software has been one of the biggest obstacles for applying model-driven architecture. The acronym for architecture-driven modernization (ADM) is coincidentally MDA in reverse. MDA is the acronym for OMG's model-driven architecture, which purports the use of models and transformations to deliver new software. ADM is related to the concept of reverse engineering. Software modernization is architecture-driven when there is the need to capture and retool various architectural aspects of existing application environments. This modernization does not preclude source-to-source migrations (where appropriate), but encourages user organizations to consider modernization from an analysis and design based perspective. In doing so, project teams will ensure that obsolete concepts or designs are not propagated into modern languages and platforms. The bottom-line results deliver modernized systems that conform more effectively to current business practices and strategic requirements.

Vendors 
Some of the vendors providing Architecture-Driven Modernization software tooling & methods:
 Blu Age
 TSRI (The Software Revolution)
 Delta Software Technology

See also
 Reverse engineering
 Software Metrics Metamodel
 Software mining
 Software modernization

References

Software architecture